James A. Squires is an American railroad executive who was the president, chief executive officer, and executive chairman of Norfolk Southern Railway until his retirement on May 1, 2022. (He left the presidency on December 1, 2021.)

Squires was born in Hollis, New Hampshire, and has degrees from Amherst College and the University of Chicago Law School.  He joined Norfolk Southern in 1992, and after working his way up the executive chain at the company was promoted to president in 2013. He was appointed to the CEO position, replacing Charles Moorman, in June 2015, and later in the year took over Moorman's role as Executive Chairman of NS' board as well.

References

Amherst College alumni
University of Chicago Law School alumni
Norfolk Southern Railway people
21st-century American railroad executives
Year of birth missing (living people)
Living people